fulfilled/complete is the second release by Omaha band Broken Spindles. It was released on Saddle Creek Records. It was released on May 4, 2004.

Track listing
 "Induction" – 4:04
 "Fall In and Down On" – 3:09
 "Song No Song" – 2:54
 "To Die, For Death" – 2:40
 "Move Away" – 3:34
 "Practice, Practice, Preach" – 1:56
 "Italian Wardrobe" – 4:49
 "Events & Affairs" – 2:22
 "Harm" – 3:09
 "The Dream" – 3:53

Credits
string arrangements for tracks 1, 2, 6, & 10 by Nate Walcott
Tracy Sands - cello
Cindy Ricker - viola
Donna Carnes - violin
Kim Salistean - violin
piano on tracks 3, 6, and 10 played by Nate Walcott
additional vocals on track 5 and 10 by Geraldine Vo

External links
Saddle Creek Records: Broken Spindles
Saddle Creek Records

2004 albums
Broken Spindles albums
Saddle Creek Records albums